Chaleco may refer to:
 Francisco Abad Moreno "Chaleco" ( 1808–1815), Spanish guerrilla
 Francisco López Contardo (born 1975), also known as "Chaleco", Chilean motorcyclist
 Chaleco, a type of clothing worn by the Quechua people